Khola is a clan (gotra) of Yaduvanshi Ahir caste that inhabits the Indian state of Haryana and Rajasthan.

See also
Ahir
Ahir clans

References

Ahir